Gloria Anne Borrego Galla (born December 16, 1933), known professionally as Gloria Romero, is a multi-awarded Filipino actress, regarded as the “Queen of Philippine Movies”, her career spans over 70 years, and she has starred in over 200 films and television programs. Some of her award-winning performances in films are Tanging Yaman (FAMAS Best Actress 2001), Nagbabagang Luha (FAMAS Best Supporting Actress 1989) and Dalagang Ilocana (FAMAS Best Actress 1955).

Dubbed as the “First Lady of Philippine Cinema”, Romero is a recipient of 6 FAMAS Awards, including the prestigious Huwarang Bituin of FAMAS Award, 3 Gawad Urian Awards and 3 FAP Awards. In 2019, she won 2 Best Actress Awards for her performance on the acclaimed film “Rainbow's Sunset” at the International Film Festival Manhattan and MMFF Awards. She is also a recipient of multiple "Lifetime Achievement Awards" across all leading award-giving bodies including: Cinemanila International Film Festival (2001), FAP (2002), FAMAS (2004), Gawad Urian (2004), MTRCB (2009) and PASADO (2010). She is also an inductee at the Eastwood City Walk of Fame and was honoured by The Philippine Post Office with a commemorative stamp, recognising her status as one of the Outstanding Filipinos Living Legends.

She was long associated with her original home studio the now defunct Sampaguita Pictures, and in the 1980s to 2011 with ABS-CBN, until in 2011 she transferred to GMA Network. Her last television program before the COVID-19 pandemic is the Sunday drama fantasy anthology series Daig Kayo ng Lola Ko as the story telling fairy-grandmother Lola Goreng.

Early life
Gloria Anne Borrego Galla was born on December 16, 1933, in Denver, Colorado, the second of four siblings. Her father, Pedro Galla, was a Filipino who went to the States for his education until he met Gloria’s mother the Spanish-American Mary Borrego. She had an elder sister named Louise, and two younger brothers Tito and Gilbert. The young Gloria together with her family travelled to the Philippines to visit their grandparents in Mabini, Pangasinan. The family’s plan of going back to Denver was always postponed, and the supposed vacation was extended. When World War II was declared, the Gallas were trapped in the Philippines, their possession was confiscated and burned by the Japanese soldier, the family escaped and hid in the mountain. During the war they were taught how to do farm works. Days before the war ended their mother died, and her father decided that the family will stay in the Philippines for good.

Gloria and her siblings became successful as they grow to adulthood, the eldest Louise became a nurse, her late brother Tito Galla (1938–1979), became a popular actor, and the youngest Gilbert is a US based doctor.

Career in film acting
As a young girl from the province, it was her childhood dream of becoming an actress. She was a movie fan of movie stars and real-life couple Tita Duran and Pancho Magalona. In an interview, she said that she once told her high school teacher that she will be a movie star.

Before becoming a huge star she started as a bit player, her very first movie was an extra in the 1949 movie Ang Bahay sa Lumang Gulod under Premiere Productions. But it was in Sampaguita Pictures that she was given a big break. She was introduced by her uncle, Nario Rosales, who was the studio’s Chief Editor. She initially portrayed the daughter of real-life couple Cesar Ramirez and Alicia Vergel, in Madame X (1952), and producers introduced her with a stage name "Gloria Romero". Romero got her first lead role in Monghita (1952) opposite Oscar Moreno. Afterward, Romero constantly topbilled box office hit films. She was often paired with Luis Gonzales in a loveteam. One of their films together was a film that chronicles the lives of Philippine Senate President Ferdinand Marcos and his wife Imelda Marcos, titled Iginuhit ng Tadhana (The Ferdinand E. Marcos Story) (1965). starring a young Bongbong Marcos who played himself and Vilma Santos-Recto who played Marcos’ eldest child Imee Marcos. The film was later followed by Pinagbuklod ng Langit, which was released in 1969.

During the 1950s, the first female onscreen rivalry in Philippine cinema was born, her famous rival was LVN Pictures movie queen and veteran actress Nida Blanca. Despite being screen rivals, they became good friends offscreen. Some movies that Romero and Blanca starred together was the blockbuster comedy film of 1984 Anak ni Waray vs. Anak ni Biday, this film reunites them with their perennial love teams Luis Gonzales and Nestor de Villa, the cast also includes Maricel Soriano and Snooky Serna. They also played mothers to matinee idol Aga Muhlach in the 1985 Lino Brocka classic Miguelito: Batang Rebelde.

Romero received her first major acting award in the Filipino Academy of Motion Arts and Sciences (FAMAS) in 1954 for the film Dalagang Ilocana. She was the third actress to receive the FAMAS award for this category, and the first actress to win for a comedy role, for a long time she holds this record, until Judy Ann Santos won in 2006 for the romantic comedy film Kasal, Kasali, Kasalo. In 2000, she starred in Tanging Yaman as the matriarch who is suffering from Alzheimer's disease, in her role she won the FAMAS best actress in 2001, she was 67 years old at the time and currently holds the record of the oldest FAMAS best actress winner.

Personal life

Marriage 
On September 24, 1960, Romero married fellow Sampaguita Pictures actor Juancho Gutierrez at the Santuario de San Antonio in Forbes Park, Makati. Romero's white gown was designed by National Artist for Fashion Ramón Valera. The entourage included the biggest stars of Sampaguita Pictures. The bridesmaids were Daisy Romualdez, Barbara Perez, Susan Roces and Amalia Fuentes. The wedding was covered by all the major newspapers and magazines and radios, headlined “Wedding of the Year”.

The couple have only one daughter Maritess Gutierrez, who tried acting briefly, and now a chef. Romero has a grandson, Chris Gutierrez, a former artist of Star Magic.

Separation
The couple separated after 12 years of being married, and Gloria did not re-marry again. In 2000, Juancho suffered a diabetic stroke that left him paralysed and reunited him with his wife Gloria, who took care of him until Juancho’s death in 2005.

Television career
After a long run as a movie star she also appeared on TV. She was a part of the television sitcom Palibhasa Lalake as the drunkard landlady Tita Minerva, and other sitcom such as Richard Loves Lucy and OK Fine Whatever! as Lola Barbie. She also appeared in Sa Dulo ng Walang Hanggan as Lola Carmela, Familia Zaragoza as Donya Amparo Zaragoza, and Sana'y Wala Nang Wakas as Donya Valeria Valencia.

On April 4, 2008, she was cast with Eddie Garcia in an episode for the drama anthology Maalaala Mo Kaya and received a nomination for the role. She appeared on the primetime drama series, May Bukas Pa, in which she played "Aling Soledad". Romero guested in the shows 30th chapter ("Greed").

Birthday TV special
In December 2008, ABS-CBN broadcast a tribute to her 75th birthday in ASAP, with guests including Dolphy, Susan Roces, German Moreno, Roderick Paulate, Gina Pareño, Christopher de Leon, Lorna Tolentino, Tirso Cruz III, Ricky Davao, Cherry Pie Picache and among others.

Transfer to GMA Network
On February 11, 2011, Romero transferred to GMA Network after being with ABS-CBN for more than 20 years. She starred in her first teledrama on GMA titled Munting Heredera, starring child star Mona Alawi. On the same year she also joined the cast of the situational comedy series Andres de Saya, the series is a television adaptation of a comic novel by Carlo J. Caparas, it stars Cesar Montano and Iza Calzado.

She continued working with GMA until the pandemic started in 2020, her last show was the Sunday fantasy anthology Daig Kayo ng Lola Ko, where she played Lola Goreng a fairy grandmother narrating different stories to her grandchildren. On July 2022, the show celebrated its fifth year anniversary, despite in hiatus, Romero was persuaded to have a special appearance in its month-long special.

Honors and Recognitions
 

Romero alongside other pillars of Philippine Cinema, was one of the first inductees on Eastwood City Walk of Fame in 2005. In the same year she was one of the 31 women awarded with PAMA-AS Gintong Bai Award at Malacañan Palace, by President Gloria Macapagal Arroyo.

She was featured three times in Yes! magazines 100 Most Beautiful Stars in the categories: "Staying Power" (2007), "The Venerable" (2009) and the “Icon” (2016).

In 2009, she became the first recipient of the lifetime achievement award from the MTRCB (Movies and Television Review and Classification Board) Award.

She was honored as a "Gawad Parangal sa mga Ginintuang Bituin ng Pelikulang Pilipino" at La Consolacion College, Manila on March 15, 2010, in celebration of National Women's Month. The following year, Romero was awarded and named as one of the 13 "Movie Icons of Our Time" at the 8th Golden Screen Awards. 

In the 57th FAMAS Award (2007), she was given the Huwarang Bituin ng FAMAS Award (FAMAS' Model Movie Star), for her durability as a movie personality and only three actors have been given this award, Dolphy(2003) and Susan Roces (2004). During the 63rd FAMAS Award (2015), she was honored as one of the Iconic Movie Queens of Philippine Cinema alongside Susan Roces, Nora Aunor, Maricel Soriano, Dawn Zulueta and Sarah Geronimo

In 2019 at 35th PMPC Star Awards For Movies celebrated Philippine Cinemas 100 Years, Romero was among the luminaries who were honored as “Natatanging Bituin ng Siglo”.

 

The Film Development Council of the Philippines (FDCP) honored Romero during 5th Film Ambassadors Night (2021) with the “Ilaw ng Industriya Award”, serving as a “veritable matriarch” to the film industry and an inspiration to generations of film actors, a rare honor usually reserved for matriarchs of Philippine movies. In 2022, the Metropolitan Theater, in cooperation with FDCP, offers “Mga Hiyas ng Sineng Filipino”, a program that aims to bring back to the big screen some of the most important restored films of Philippine Cinema including the 1954 classic comedy “Dalagang Ilocana”, where Romero won her first FAMAS for best actress.

In February 2022 the Philippine Post Office honored Romero with a commemorative stamp as part of their “Outstanding Filipinos Series : Living Legends". The launch of the said commemorative stamps coincided with the 75th year since the first stamp of the Republic of the Philippines was issued.

Filmography
In her more than 70 years in the industry, Romero made more than 200 films and TV shows for different studios and networks, including Sampaguita Pictures, LVN, Lea Production, Regal Films, GMA Films, and Star Cinema as well as Independent films.

Television

Film

Awards

 

GMMSF Box-Office Entertainment Awards
 2001 All-Time Favorite Actress, Winner
 2003 All-Time Favorite Actress, Winner

TV Awards
 1988 PMPC Star Award for Best Comedy Actress-(Palibhasa Lalake), Winner

Lifetime Achievement Awards

 2001 Cinemanila International Film Festival
 2009 MTRCB Awards
 2010 Pasado Awards
 2011 Movie Icons of Our Time Award
 2012 PMPC Ading Fernando Lifetime Achievement Award

Notes
 Shared with the cast of Tanging Yaman.

References

External links
 

1933 births
Living people
20th-century Filipino actresses
21st-century Filipino actresses
ABS-CBN personalities
Actresses from Denver
Actresses from Pangasinan
Filipino film actresses
Filipino people of American descent
Filipino television actresses
Filipino women comedians
GMA Network personalities
Ilocano people